Gucheng East railway station is a railway station on the Shangqiu–Hangzhou high-speed railway in Gucheng town, Qiaocheng District, Bozhou, Anhui, China. The station opened on 1 December 2019.

References

Railway stations in Anhui
Railway stations in China opened in 2019